San Francisco Logueche  is a town and municipality in Oaxaca in south-western Mexico. The municipality covers an area of 76.55  km². 
It is part of the Miahuatlán District in the south of the Sierra Sur Region.

As of 2005, the municipality had a total population of 2240.

Amatlán Zapotec is spoken in the town. It is located "at the foot of a very tall mountain" called  Yiroos in Zapotec.

References

Municipalities of Oaxaca